Sault Ste. Marie Museum is a museum in Sault Ste. Marie, Ontario, Canada. Built as a post office from 1902 to 1906, this building became a museum in 1982 when it was purchased by the City of Sault Ste. Marie.

Museums in Sault Ste. Marie, Ontario